Sathorn Pier, with designated pier code/number CEN, is a major pier on the Chao Phraya River located beneath the Taksin Bridge, Sathorn Road in Bangkok, Thailand.

It is the main pier for the Chao Phraya Express Boat and MINE Smart Ferry with all services stopping at this pier.  There is also a cross-river ferry service from the pier to Charoen Nakhon in Thonburi. Sathorn Pier is located adjacent to the Saphan Taksin Station, making this location the only place for commuters to transfer between the Chao Phraya Express Boat service and the Bangkok BTS Skytrain Silom Line rail service.

The pier is adjacent to the Shangri-La Hotel, Bangkok.

Nearby landmarks 
Sathorn Unique Tower
Shangri-La Hotel
King Taksin the Great Bridge
Original Bangkok Touren in Deutsch
Sathon Road

External links
Chao Phraya Express Boat website http://www.chaophrayaexpressboat.com/en/home/

References

Chao Phraya Express Boat piers
Buildings and structures in Bangkok
Sathon district